Robert Paul Brenner (born November 28, 1943) is an American economic historian. He is a professor emeritus of history and director of the Center for Social Theory and Comparative History at UCLA, editor of the socialist journal Against the Current, and editorial committee member of New Left Review. His research interests are early modern European history, economic, social and religious history, agrarian history, social theory/Marxism, and Tudor–Stuart England.

Brenner contributed to a debate among Marxists on the "Transition from Feudalism to Capitalism", emphasizing the importance of the transformation of agricultural production in Europe, especially in the English countryside, rather than the rise of international trade as the main cause of the transition.

His influential 1976 article, Agrarian Class Structure and Economic Development in Pre-Industrial Europe, started the Brenner debate. He argued that smallholding peasants had strong property rights and had little incentive to give up traditional technology or go beyond local markets and no incentive toward capitalism.

In the spring of 2017, Brenner and Vivek Chibber assumed editorial duties and co-launched the academic journal Catalyst: A Journal of Theory and Strategy, with the assistance of Jacobin magazine.

Books and publications 
1976: 
1993: Merchants and revolution : commercial change, political conflict, and London's overseas traders, 1550–1653 (Princeton, Princeton University Press) 
2002: The boom and the bubble : the US in the world economy (New York, Verso) 
2006: The economics of global turbulence : the advanced capitalist economies from Long Boom to Long Downturn, 1945–2005 (New York, Verso) 
2009: Property and progress : the historical origins and social foundations of self-sustaining growth (London, Verso)

References

External links 
Articles
 "Dobb on the Transition From Feudalism to Capitalism". Cambridge Journal of Economics, 1978, 2, 121-140
"The economy after the boom: a diagnosis", International Viewpoint, 342, July/August 2002.
 The origins of capitalism (with Chris Harman). International Socialism Issue 111,  3 July 2006.

"Devastating Crisis Unfolds", Against the Current, 132, January/February 2008.
"The Economy in a World of Trouble", International Viewpoint, 411, April 2009.
"What is Good for Goldman Sachs is Good for America - The Origins of the Present Crisis" (October 2, 2009). Center for Social Theory and Comparative History. Paper 2009–11.

Videos
"Robert Brenner: The Consequences of Dependence on Asset Price Bubbles"  (April 8, 2010). Rethinking Capitalism Conference. University Center, UC Santa Cruz

1943 births
Economic historians
Living people
Marxist theorists
Marxist writers
Deutscher Memorial Prize winners
Reed College alumni
University of California, Los Angeles faculty
Writers about globalization
American Marxist historians
Historians from California